I'm Not Your Man is the second full-length studio album by English musician Marika Hackman. It was released on 2 June 2017 by AMF Records, Virgin EMI Records, Sub Pop and Hostess Entertainment Unlimited.

Critical reception

I'm Not Your Man received positive reviews from critics upon its release. At Metacritic, which assigns a normalised rating out of 100 to reviews from mainstream publications, the album received an average score of 80, based on 15 reviews.

Comparing it to Hackman's debut album, Rob Hughes of Uncut said, "I'm Not Your Man is a much rowdier navigation of female relationships and sexuality that moves between dark dreampop and post-Belly/Breeders rock, armed with flashing hooks." Andre Pain of the Evening Standard said, "Hackman has come of age on this arresting and emotionally charged album." Chris Taylor of The Line of Best Fit praised the album, writing, "Her new found confidence comes through in spades here and the end product is a record that shines with a captivating vibrancy. Often mislabeled and perhaps underestimated, Marika uses I'm Not Your Man to break out of that pigeonhole she was put into with gusto."

Chris Catchpole of Q wrote, "It's too long, but otherwise is an unexpected and thoroughly enjoyable artistic left-turn." In his review for Mojo, Andrew Perry wrote that "the record increasingly drifts into hazy, slo-mo dream-pop, which inescapably pales beside the bolder tracks upfront."

Track listing

Personnel
Credits adapted from liner notes.

Musicians
 Marika Hackman – vocals , guitar , bass guitar , drums , sarangi , congas , string arrangement 
 Charlie Andrew – congas , drums 
 Juliette Jackson – guitar , background vocals 
 Sophie Nathan – guitar , background vocals 
 Celia Archer – bass guitar , background vocals 
 Fern Ford – drums 
 Kirsty Mangan – viola , violin , strings , string arrangement 
 Rachael Lander – cello 
 Austin Cooper – trumpet 
 Mark Rainbow – background vocals 

Technical
 Charlie Andrew – production, mixing
 Brett Cox – recording engineering
 Jay Pocknell – assistant recording engineering
 Katie Earl – assistant recording engineering
 Dick Beetham – mastering

Artwork
 Tristan Pigott – artwork
 Jeff Kleinsmith – design, art direction
 Marika Hackman – art direction

Charts

References

2017 albums
Marika Hackman albums
AMF Records albums
Virgin EMI Records albums
Sub Pop albums
Hostess Entertainment Unlimited albums
Albums produced by Charlie Andrew